Moss Run may refer to:

Moss Run, Ohio, an unincorporated community
Moss Run (Little Muskingum River tributary), a stream in Ohio
Moss Run, Virginia, an unincorporated community